The Legend of Heroes: Trails to Azure, known as  in Japan, is a 2011 role-playing video game developed by Nihon Falcom. The game is a part of the Trails series, itself a part of the larger The Legend of Heroes series. Trails to Azure serves as a sequel to Trails from Zero (2010), forming the second and final part of the series' "Crossbell arc".

Trails to Azure first released in Japan for the PlayStation Portable, with no release outside of Asia until March 2023, when it was released by NIS America for Windows, PlayStation 4, and Nintendo Switch. The English release was based upon the work of a fan translation.

Plot
Trails to Azure is set a few months after the ending of Trails from Zero. The Special Support Section (SSS) are joined by new recruits – the Army sergeant major Noel Seeker and the former gang leader Wazy Hemisphere. 

Again, unscrupulous figures seek to use the powers of KeA, the SSS's young ward, for their own ends. They are led by the mayor, Dieter Crois, who declares Crossbell's independence and seeks to ensure it through the powers of KeA, and his daughter Mariabell, who seeks to use KeA to rewrite history. The SSS have to brave civil unrest and occult intrusions to foil their plans. Both Dieter and Mariabell Crois are defeated, the former is arrested and the latter joins Ouroboros and KeA relinquishes her powers, but all of these events lead to Crossbell's annexation by the Erebonian Empire, which leads into the "Divertissement" chapter of Trails of Cold Steel II and the events of the latter half of the Trails of Cold Steel series.

Release
Ao no Kiseki was released in Japan for the PlayStation Portable on September 29, 2011. It was later ported to Windows for release in China on March 28, 2013. It was also released for the PlayStation Vita in Japan on June 12, 2014, as Ao no Kiseki: Evolution. This version features improved visuals and more voice acting. The Evolution version received a remaster for the PlayStation 4, releasing in Japan under the title Ao no Kiseki Kai on May 28, 2020. It was released by Clouded Leopard Entertainment for the Nintendo Switch in Asia on April 22, 2021.

Due to a variety of reasons, Trails to Azure and its prequel, Trails from Zero, were not localized in English by the time of the Japanese release of Trails of Cold Steel. Falcom subsequently approached Xseed Games, who had previously localized Trails in the Sky, and requested that a localization of Trails of Cold Steel be prioritized instead, resulting in Trails from Zero and Trails to Azure being skipped. An English fan translation was released in 2018, with another one by a team known as the "Geofront" released in May 2021. Geofront's release would serve as the foundation for an official English version by NIS America for Nintendo Switch, PlayStation 4 and Windows, released in North America on March 14, 2023, in Europe on March 17, and in Australasia on March 24.

Reception
Trails to Azure was listed as one of the best upcoming games of 2011 at that year's Tokyo Game Show. Along with Trails from Zero, Comic Book Resources highlighted the game's "persistent overarching storyline, immersive and detailed settings, masterful character development [and] unique battle system". They noted that despite the lack of an official localization at the time, the plot and characters were integral to understanding later games in the series.

Notes

References

External links
 

2011 video games
Fiction about invasions
Japanese role-playing video games
Nihon Falcom games
Nintendo Switch games
PlayStation 4 games
PlayStation Portable games
PlayStation Vita games
Role-playing video games
Single-player video games
The Legend of Heroes
Trails (series)
Video game sequels
Video games about multiple time paths
Video games about police officers
Video games developed in Japan
Windows games